Raymond Fraser  (May 8, 1941 – October 22, 2018) was a Canadian biographer, editor, essayist, memoirist, novelist, poet and short story writer. Fraser published fourteen books of fiction, three of non-fiction, and eight poetry collections. Fraser's writings were praised by such literary figures as Farley Mowat, Irving Layton, Louis Dudek, Alden Nowlan, Sheila Watson, Leonard Cohen, Hugh Garner, and Michael Cook.

Biography
Born in Chatham, New Brunswick, Raymond Fraser attended St. Thomas University where in his freshman year he played on the varsity hockey and football teams, and in his junior year was co-editor with John Brebner of the student literary magazine Tom-Tom. His 20-year correspondence and friendship with the poet Alden Nowlan date from this period.

During the sixties Fraser worked as a lab technician, a high school teacher, and as editor and freelance writer for a number of tabloid newspapers.

While living in Montreal in 1966, Fraser and poet Leroy Johnson founded the literary magazine Intercourse: Contemporary Canadian Writing. In 1971 he was one of the founders of the Montreal Story Tellers Fiction Performance Group and the Rank Outsiders Poetry Extravaganza. His first book of fiction, The Black Horse Tavern (1973), was published in Montreal by Ingluvin Publications.

Fraser died in Fredericton, New Brunswick, on October 22, 2018 at the age of 77.

Awards and recognition
His novel, The Bannonbridge Musicians (Ingluvin Publications) was a finalist for the 1978 Governor General's Award.

In 2009, following publication of his novel In Another Life (Lion's Head Press), he received the inaugural Lieutenant-Governor's Award for High Achievement in the Arts for English Language Literary Arts.

Five of Fraser's books were listed in Atlantic Canada's 100 Greatest Books (Nimbus Publishing, 2009), a distinction shared by only three other authors.

In 2012 he was made a member of the Order of New Brunswick, the province's highest honour, for his contributions to literature and New Brunswick's cultural life.

In May 2016, he received an honorary Doctor of Letters degree from his alma mater, St Thomas University.  In 2017, he received the Canadian Senate Sesquicentennial Medal in recognition of valuable service to the nation.

Over the years he received four Canada Council Grants, six New Brunswick Arts Board Grants, and the Canadian Writers' Trust Woodcock Grant.

Bibliography

Fiction
The Black Horse Tavern – 1973. Revised definitive edition with an Introduction by the author – 2014 (novella & stories)
The Struggle Outside – 1975. Revised definitive edition with an Afterword by the author – 2013 (novel)
The Bannonbridge Musicians – 1978. Revised definitive edition – 2014 (novel)
Rum River – 1997. Revised definitive edition – 2016 (novel)
Costa Blanca – 2001, 2013 (novella & stories)
In a Cloud of Dust and Smoke – 2003, 2013 (novel)
The Grumpy Man – 2008, 2013 (novella & stories)
In Another Life – 2009, 2013 (novel)
The Trials Of Brother Bell – 2010 (two novels, Repentance Vale & The Struggle Outside)
The Madness Of Youth – 2011, 2013 (novel)
Repentance Vale – 2011, 2013 (novel)
Bliss – 2013 (stories)
Seasons of Discontent – 2015 (novel)
Through Sunlight and Shadows – 2018 (novel)

Biography
The Fighting Fisherman: The Life of Yvon Durelle – 1981, 1983, 2005
Todd Matchett: Confessions of a Young Criminal – 1994

Memoirs and essays
When The Earth Was Flat – 2007, 2013

Poetry
For the Miramichi – 1966
Waiting for God's Angel – 1967
I've Laughed and Sung – 1969
The More I Live – 1971
Stop The Highway... 4 Montreal Poets: Raymond Fraser, Clifford Gaston, Bob Higgins & Bryan McCarthy – 1972
Macbride Poems – 1992
Before You're A Stranger – 2000
As I See it – 2017

eBooks
The Black Horse Tavern
Bliss
Costa Blanca
When The Earth Was Flat
The Grumpy Man
Repentance Vale

Anthology edited
East of Canada: An Atlantic Anthology – 1977 (Eds.: Raymond Fraser, Clyde Rose and Jim Stewart)

Literary magazines edited
Tom-Tom (St. Thomas University) Raymond Fraser and John Brebner, eds. 1962.
Intercourse: Contemporary Canadian Writing Raymond Fraser et al., eds. 1966–1971.
The Pottersfield Portfolio  Raymond Fraser et al., eds. 1990–1992.
Lion's Head Magazine (online) Raymond Fraser and Bernell MacDonald, eds. 2014– .

References

 J. R. (Tim) Struthers, ed. The Montreal Story Tellers. Montreal: Vehicle Press. 1985.
 Margie Williamson. Four Maritime Poets: a survey of the works of Alden Nowlan, Fred Cogswell, Raymond Fraser and Al Pittman, as they reflect the spirit and culture of the Maritime people. Thesis (M.A.), Dalhousie University, 1973 [microform].
 Stephen Patrick Clare & Trevor J. Adams. Atlantic Canada's 100 Greatest Books. Halifax: Nimbus Publishing Ltd. 2009.
 Canadian Who's Who. Toronto: Third Sector Publishing. 2015.

External links
 Archival records for Raymond Fraser at the University of New Brunswick
 Raymond Fraser's weblog
 Atlantic Canadian Poets Archive
 New Brunswick Literary Encyclopedia

1941 births
2018 deaths
Canadian biographers
Canadian male non-fiction writers
Canadian male novelists
Canadian male poets
Canadian male short story writers
Canadian people of Scottish descent
Male biographers
Members of the Order of New Brunswick
People from Miramichi, New Brunswick
People from Northumberland County, New Brunswick
St. Thomas University (New Brunswick) alumni
20th-century biographers
20th-century Canadian male writers
20th-century Canadian poets
20th-century Canadian novelists
20th-century Canadian short story writers
21st-century biographers
21st-century Canadian male writers
21st-century Canadian novelists
21st-century Canadian poets
21st-century Canadian short story writers
Writers from New Brunswick